The Wilhelminakerk was a former church in Rotterdam, built at the end of 19th century as a new district church of the then independent Dutch Reformed Church. It was razed in the 1970s.

History
Like the Koninginnekerk in Rotterdam this church was built thanks to a gift from the sisters Van Dam. The inauguration followed on 27 November 1898. It was a strong centralizing church hall plan with a developed, closed three-sided apse and front tower, flanked by two lower stair towers. The apse was externally accentuated by a simple gable and ridge turrets. The interior was equipped with galleries and was dominated by a strong standing in the chancel choir. The building was an important example of stylistic innovation in the Protestant church building in 1900, resulting from the eclecticism, equally important work from the work of Hooykaas B. Jr.

The church in the postwar years was widely known for the organ concerts of the renowned organist and conductor, Feike Asma. As a result of declining church attendance, the church was decommissioned in 1972 and demolished in the years thereafter. Much of the pipes from the organ was purchased by the Reformed Church Veenendaal and be used for the organ of the Oude Kerk in Veenendaal.

Churches in Rotterdam
19th-century Calvinist and Reformed churches
Demolished buildings and structures in the Netherlands
Buildings and structures demolished in the 1970s
19th-century churches in the Netherlands